Atlantic Beach is a town in Carteret County, North Carolina, United States. It is one of the five communities located on Bogue Banks. The population was 1,495 at the 2010 census.

History
The idea of Atlantic Beach was first envisioned in the 1870s by Appleton Oaksmith. However, construction did not begin until 1887. In 1928, a bridge was built, connecting Atlantic Beach to Morehead City.

Fort Macon and Queen Anne's Revenge are listed on the National Register of Historic Places.

The United States Coast Guard homeports several cutters in Atlantic Beach.

Geography
Atlantic Beach is located at  (34.700455, -76.740814) on the eastern portion of Bogue Banks, a barrier island on the Atlantic coast. The town is bordered to the south by the Atlantic Ocean and to the north by Bogue Sound, which separates it from the mainland. To the east is Fort Macon State Park, occupying the eastern end of Bogue Banks and overlooking Beaufort Inlet, while to the west is the town of Pine Knoll Shores.

Atlantic Beach is connected to the mainland by the Atlantic Beach Causeway to Morehead City. North Carolina Highway 58 leads west from Atlantic Beach, running the length of Bogue Banks to Emerald Isle.

Climate
Atlantic Beach has a subtropical climate, like much of the Southeastern United States, characterized by short, relatively mild winters and long, hot, and humid summers. Summers in Atlantic Beach are cooler than a lot of cities within the southeastern region of the United States, primarily because of its close location to the ocean, and winters similarly see less extreme temperatures.

Demographics

2020 census

As of the 2020 United States census, there were 1,364 people, 934 households, and 447 families residing in the town.

2008
As of the census of 2008, there were 1,815 people, 971 households, and 498 families residing in the town. There were 4,728 housing units at an average density of 2,206.0 per square mile (853.0/km2). The racial makeup of the town was 98.03% White, 0.62% African American, 0.22% Native American, 0.73% Asian, 0.00% from other races, and 0.39% from two or more races. Hispanic or Latino of any race were 0.67% of the population.

There were 971 households, out of which 11.8% had children under the age of 18 living with them, 44.1% were married couples living together, 5.0% had a female householder with no husband present, and 48.7% were non-families. 39.6% of all households were made up of individuals, and 9.0% had someone living alone who was 65 years of age or older. The average household size was 1.82 and the average family size was 2.33.

In the town, the population was spread out, with 9.8% under the age of 18, 6.9% from 18 to 24, 26.3% from 25 to 44, 38.8% from 45 to 64, and 18.2% who were 65 years of age or older. The median age was 49 years. For every 100 females, there were 112.0 males. For every 100 females age 18 and over, there were 111.2 males.

The median income for a household in the town was $38,313, and the median income for a family was $52,411. Males had a median income of $32,045 versus $24,706 for females. The per capita income for the town was $31,339. 7.3% of the population and 5.3% of families were below the poverty line. Out of the total people living in poverty, 9.8% are under the age of 18 and 1.5% are 65 or older.

Atlantic Beach is a popular destination for tourists and fishermen during the fall, spring and summer.  Much of its economy is driven by restaurants, hotels and other attractions such as Fort Macon State Park.

(Media/television) Featured on a (Christmas Themed) Rescue 9-1-1- Episode in a segment titled "Christmas Bulb Choke" where a baby chokes on a metallic top of the Christmas bulb, Episode #612.

References

External links

 Town of Atlantic Beach official website
 Atlantic Beach NC Attractions and Restaurants
 Online directory for Atlantic Beach NC
 Restaurant Guide for Atlantic Beach NC
 Atlantic Beach, NC on InsiderInfo.us
 Atlantic Beach, NC on BeachCarolina.com

Towns in North Carolina
Towns in Carteret County, North Carolina
Beaches of North Carolina
Bogue Banks
Landforms of Carteret County, North Carolina
Populated coastal places in North Carolina